Stefan Wenk (born 13 March 1981 in Filderstadt, Baden-Württemberg) is a male javelin thrower from Germany. His personal best throw is 83.94 metres, achieved in June 2006 at Bislett stadion.

Achievements

Seasonal bests by year
2000 - 73.06
2001 - 78.65
2002 - 81.20
2003 - 79.42
2004 - 82.95
2005 - 83.07
2006 - 83.94
2007 - 80.34
2008 - 75.53

References

1981 births
Living people
German male javelin throwers
People from Filderstadt
Sportspeople from Stuttgart (region)